Jarkko Antero Immonen (born January 18, 1984) is a Finnish professional ice hockey forward who is playing for HKm Zvolen in Slovakia. He was selected by the Dallas Stars in the 4th round (110th overall) of the   2002 NHL Entry Draft.

Midway through the 2010–11 season, on January 28, 2011, Immonen transferred from his first SM-lliga club, the Espoo Blues, to the Pelicans and signed an addition one-year contract. In the following 2011–12 season, Immonen enjoyed his most successful season win the SM-liiga since 2008, scoring 32 points in 59 games to help the Pelicans reach the finals.

On May 3, 2012, he was re-signed to a two-year extension with the Pelicans.

Career statistics

Regular season and playoffs

International

References

External links

1984 births
Living people
Espoo Blues players
Lahti Pelicans players
SaiPa players
Dallas Stars draft picks
Finnish ice hockey forwards
People from Kouvola
Sportspeople from Kymenlaakso